"Keys to the Kingdom" is a song by American rock band Linkin Park from their sixth studio album, The Hunting Party. It is the album's opening track, and entered the UK Rock chart at number 33, although it was not released as a single. The song was written by the band and produced by co-lead vocalist Mike Shinoda and lead guitarist Brad Delson.

Composition
"Keys to the Kingdom" is explained in an early preview for the album as, "Right off the bat this track has an old-school punk vibe with a new twist. The hasty drums and explosive riffs  [add] a hardcore element to it. Vocalist Chester Bennington unleashes melodies and the balance of Shinoda’s rap verses makes for a powerful combination. Although the band will be playing arenas on their forthcoming Carnivores tour, this song has an underground feel that would welcome them to a small, beat up venue in Brooklyn, N.Y." The song continues its outro into the album's second track, "All for Nothing" featuring Page Hamilton of Helmet.

Reception
In a track-by-track review for the album, by Billboards Kenneth Partridge highlighted Linkin Park's "back-to-basics approach", hardcore punk-styled introduction, and overall nu metal sound akin to their early releases.

Personnel
 Chester Bennington – vocals
 Mike Shinoda –  lead and rap vocals, rhythm guitar, keyboards
 Brad Delson – lead guitar, backing vocals, programming
 Dave "Phoenix" Farrell – bass guitar, backing vocals
 Joe Hahn – sampling, programming
 Rob Bourdon – drums, percussion

Charts

References

2014 songs
Linkin Park songs
Songs written by Mike Shinoda
Alternative metal songs